Kanfory Mohamed "Lappé" Bangoura (born in 1961) is a Guinean football coach.

Bangoura was appointed manager of the Guinea national football team in July 2016. He was sacked in January 2018.

References

External sources 
 Info concerning the trainer on footballdatabase.eu

Living people
Guinea national football team managers
Horoya AC managers
1961 births
Guinean football managers